Ellefsen Harbour is a harbour lying at the south end of Powell Island between Christoffersen Island and Michelsen Island, in the South Orkney Islands. It was discovered in the course of a joint cruise by Captain George Powell, a British sealer, and Captain Nathaniel Palmer, an American sealer, in December 1821. Shortly afterward, it was briefly occupied by Sam Pointer. The name first appeared on Powell's chart published in 1822.

References 

Powell Island
Ports and harbours of the South Orkney Islands